The 39th parallel north is a circle of latitude that is 39 degrees north of the Earth's equatorial plane. It crosses Europe, the Mediterranean Sea, Asia, the Pacific Ocean, North America, and the Atlantic Ocean.

At this latitude the sun is visible for 14 hours, 54 minutes during the summer solstice and 9 hours, 26 minutes during the winter solstice.

Daylight along the 39th parallel north falls under 10 hours a day starting on 18 November and returns to over ten hours a day beginning 24 January. The growth of crops and other plants is considerably slowed during this period of reduced sunlight.

In the United States, the eastern boundary of the state of California was defined as following the 120th meridian west south from the 42nd parallel north to its intersection with the 39th parallel north, beyond which it follows a diagonal line to where the Colorado River crosses the 35th parallel north.

Around the world
Starting at the Prime Meridian and heading eastwards, the parallel 39° north passes through:

{| class="wikitable plainrowheaders"
! scope="col" width="125" | Co-ordinates
! scope="col" | Country, territory or sea
! scope="col" | Notes
|-
| style="background:#b0e0e6;" | 
! scope="row" style="background:#b0e0e6;" | Mediterranean Sea
| style="background:#b0e0e6;" |
|-
| 
! scope="row" | 
| Island of Ibiza
|-
| style="background:#b0e0e6;" | 
! scope="row" style="background:#b0e0e6;" | Mediterranean Sea
| style="background:#b0e0e6;" | Passing just south of the island of Cabrera, 
|-
| 
! scope="row" | 
| Islands of Sant'Antioco and Sardinia
|-
| style="background:#b0e0e6;" | 
! scope="row" style="background:#b0e0e6;" | Mediterranean Sea
| style="background:#b0e0e6;" | Tyrrhenian Sea - passing just north of the island of Stromboli, 
|-
| 
! scope="row" | 
|
|-
| style="background:#b0e0e6;" | 
! scope="row" style="background:#b0e0e6;" | Mediterranean Sea
| style="background:#b0e0e6;" | Ionian Sea
|-
| 
! scope="row" | 
| Mainland and island of Euboea
|-
| style="background:#b0e0e6;" | 
! scope="row" style="background:#b0e0e6;" | Aegean Sea
| style="background:#b0e0e6;" | Passing just north of the island of Skyros, 
|-
| 
! scope="row" | 
| Island of Lesbos
|-
| style="background:#b0e0e6;" | 
! scope="row" style="background:#b0e0e6;" | Aegean Sea
| style="background:#b0e0e6;" |
|-
| 
! scope="row" | 
|
|-
| 
! scope="row" | 
|
|-
| 
! scope="row" | 
| Nakhchivan exclave
|-
| 
! scope="row" | 
|
|-
| 
! scope="row" | 
|
|-
| 
! scope="row" | 
|
|-
| 
! scope="row" | 
|
|-
| style="background:#b0e0e6;" | 
! scope="row" style="background:#b0e0e6;" | Caspian Sea
| style="background:#b0e0e6;" |
|-
| 
! scope="row" | 
| Island of Ogurja Ada
|-
| style="background:#b0e0e6;" | 
! scope="row" style="background:#b0e0e6;" | Caspian Sea
| style="background:#b0e0e6;" |
|-
| 
! scope="row" | 
| Passing just south of Türkmenabat
|-
| 
! scope="row" | 
|
|-
| 
! scope="row" | 
|
|-valign="top"
| 
! scope="row" | 
| Xinjiang Qinghai Gansu Qinghai Gansu Qinghai (for about 7 km) Gansu (for about 30 km) Qinghai (for about 17 km) Gansu Inner Mongolia (for about 16 km) Gansu (for about 6 km) Inner Mongolia Gansu Inner Mongolia Ningxia Inner Mongolia Shaanxi Shanxi Hebei Tianjin (just south of the city centre)
|-
| style="background:#b0e0e6;" | 
! scope="row" style="background:#b0e0e6;" | Yellow Sea
| style="background:#b0e0e6;" | Bohai Gulf
|-
| 
! scope="row" | 
| Liaoning (Liaodong Peninsula) — passing just north of Dalian
|-
| style="background:#b0e0e6;" | 
! scope="row" style="background:#b0e0e6;" | Yellow Sea
| style="background:#b0e0e6;" | Passing just south of Zhangzi Island and Haiyang Island
|-
| 
! scope="row" | 
| South Pyeongan ProvincePassing through Pyongyang-Daedong RiverSouth Pyeongan Province Gangwon Province - Passing just south of Wonsan
|-
| style="background:#b0e0e6;" | 
! scope="row" style="background:#b0e0e6;" | Sea of Japan
| style="background:#b0e0e6;" |
|-valign="top"
| 
! scope="row" | 
| Island of Honshū: — Yamagata Prefecture— Akita Prefecture— Iwate Prefecture— Miyagi Prefecture − for about 1 km— Iwate Prefecture
|-
| style="background:#b0e0e6;" | 
! scope="row" style="background:#b0e0e6;" | Pacific Ocean
| style="background:#b0e0e6;" |
|-valign="top"
| 
! scope="row" | 
|-
| style="background:#b0e0e6;" | 
! scope="row" style="background:#b0e0e6;" | Delaware Bay
| style="background:#b0e0e6;" |
|-
| 
! scope="row" | 
| New Jersey - passing through Cape May Airport
|-valign="top"
| style="background:#b0e0e6;" | 
! scope="row" style="background:#b0e0e6;" | Atlantic Ocean
| style="background:#b0e0e6;" | Passing between the islands of Graciosa (almost crossing its southern tip) and São Jorge, Azores, 
|-
| 
! scope="row" | 
| Passing about 30km north of Lisbon
|-
| 
! scope="row" | 
| Passing through Ciudad Real and Albacete
|-
| style="background:#b0e0e6;" | 
! scope="row" style="background:#b0e0e6;" | Mediterranean Sea
| style="background:#b0e0e6;" |
|}

See also
38th parallel north
40th parallel north

References

n39